An imperial vicar was a prince charged with administering all or part of the Holy Roman Empire on behalf of the emperor. Later, an imperial vicar was invariably one of two princes charged by the Golden Bull with administering the Holy Roman Empire during an interregnum.

Overview
The Holy Roman Empire was an elective monarchy, not a hereditary one. When an emperor died, if a king of the Romans had not already been elected, there would be no new emperor for a matter of several months until all the electors, or their representatives, could assemble for a new imperial election.  During that time, imperial institutions still required oversight.  This was performed by two imperial vicars. Each vicar, in the words of the Golden Bull, was "the administrator of the empire itself, with the power of passing judgments, of presenting to ecclesiastical benefices, of collecting returns and revenues and investing with fiefs, of receiving oaths of fealty for and in the name of the holy empire". All acts of the vicars were subject to ratification by the elected king or emperor. On many occasions, however, there was no interregnum, as a new king had been elected during the lifetime of his predecessor.

The vicariate came to be associated with two counts palatinate: the duke and elector of Saxony (who also held the position of count palatine of Saxony) was vicar in areas operating under Saxon law (Saxony, Westphalia, Hanover, and northern Germany); the count palatine of the Rhine, also an elector, was vicar in the remainder of the Empire (Franconia, Swabia, the Rhine, and southern Germany). The Golden Bull of 1356 confirmed the position of the two electors.

Disputes over the Palatine electorate from 1648 to 1777 led to confusion about who the rightful vicar was. In 1623, the Palatine Electorate was transferred to the duke (and thenceforth elector) of Bavaria. However, in 1648 a new electorate was created for the restored Count Palatine of the Rhine, which led to disputes between the two as to which was vicar. In 1657, both purported to act as vicar, but the Saxon vicar recognised the elector of Bavaria. In 1711, while the elector of Bavaria was under the ban of the Empire, the elector palatine again acted as vicar, but his cousin was restored to his position upon his restoration three years later. In 1724, the two electors made a pact to act as joint vicars, but the Imperial Diet rejected the agreement. Finally, in 1745, the two agreed to alternate as vicar, with Bavaria starting first. This arrangement was upheld by the Imperial Diet at Regensburg in 1752. In 1777 the question became moot when the elector palatine inherited Bavaria.

In 1806, Emperor Francis II abdicated the imperial throne and also declared the dissolution of the Holy Roman Empire itself in the wake of defeats by France and the defection of much of southern and western Germany from the Empire to join the new Confederation of the Rhine.  His decision to declare the dissolution of the Empire as well as to abdicate was apparently partially designed to forestall an interregnum with rule by the imperial vicars, which he feared might result in the election of Napoleon as emperor.

List of imperial vicars, 1437–1792

Imperial vicar for particular provinces 

In the Empire's early centuries, imperial vicars were appointed from time to time to administer one of the Empire's constituent kingdoms of Germany, Italy or Arles. This was in fact a different office. 

In Italy, the position of "imperial vicar" was conferred to several princes throughout history. This has to be distinguished from the general vicarship over Imperial Italy as a whole. The title was conferred to the Count of Savoy by Emperor Frederick II in 1226. In the second half of the 14th century, Charles IV, Holy Roman Emperor made permanent Frederick's decision and associated it to the title of Duke of Savoy. In 1556, given that France occupied the Savoyard states in 1535–1536, Emperor Charles V intended to transfer the position to Philip II of Spain with his abdication but Philip's requests to receive the title were denied by Charles's successor Ferdinand I, Holy Roman Emperor. Duke Emmanuel Philibert of Savoy used the Imperial vicarship in order to recover the dynastic possessions of his family in 1557-1559. Furthermore, he and his successors exercised the title to assert a formal primacy among Italian imperial princes (although this was also claimed by the ruler of Tuscany who held the unique title of Grand Duke) and to present themselves as champions of Italian liberties up to the 1800s. In 1624 the office of the general commissioner respectively plenipotentiary was created for Imperial Italy, which factually took over the original tasks of the imperial vicariate, which had only been a titular vicariate since Charles IV.

In the absence of an emperor, the right to appoint vicars for provinces was exercised by the pope. This is not to be confused with the ecclesiastical office of vicar.

References